Ranczo Wilkowyje is a Polish film released in 2007 directed by Wojciech Adamczyk, which follows the story of television series produced by TVP Ranczo.

The film was shown in cinemas and is available for sale on DVD.

Additional Information
 Term began shooting on July 17, 2007. The photos were made in Latowicz and Jeruzal.
 English language has been replaced by a voice-over and Polish subtitles.

Cast

External links 

Polish comedy films
2007 films